Denzelle Good (born March 8, 1991) is a former American football offensive guard. He played college football at NC State and later Mars Hill, and was drafted by the Indianapolis Colts in the seventh round of the 2015 NFL Draft.

College career
Good initially went to North Carolina State on a football scholarship, but was released from his scholarship as a redshirt freshman in 2010. He then attended Mars Hill University from 2012 to 2014.

Professional career

Indianapolis Colts
Good was drafted by the Indianapolis Colts in the seventh round (255th overall) of the 2015 NFL draft. He was just the third player from Mars Hill University to ever be drafted, and the first since 2003. He agreed to terms with the Colts on May 6, 2015.

Good was inactive for the first 11 weeks of the season, before making his NFL debut against the Tampa Bay Buccaneers. He would play in 6 games in the 2015 season, 4 of which he started.

Good entered the 2017 season as the Colts starting right tackle. On September 13, 2017, Good was placed on injured reserve. He was activated off injured reserve to the active roster on November 9, 2017.

In 2018, Good played in two games, starting one at right tackle, before being waived on December 1, 2018. Over his tenure with the team he appeared in 26 games, starting 20.

Oakland / Las Vegas Raiders
On December 3, 2018, Good was claimed off waivers by the Oakland Raiders. He started the final three games of the season at right guard in place of an injured Gabe Jackson.

Good signed a one-year contract extension with the Raiders on March 2, 2019. He started five games at both guard spots in 2019 due to injuries.

On January 9, 2020, Good signed a one-year contract extension with the Raiders. He was placed on the reserve/COVID-19 list by the team on October 22, 2020, and was activated two days later.

Good re-signed with the Raiders on March 24, 2021, on a two-year contract. He suffered a torn ACL in Week 1 and was placed on season-ending injured reserve on September 14, 2021.

Retirement
On July 25, 2022, Good was placed on the reserve/retired list.

Personal life
Good was born on March 8, 1991, in Gaffney, South Carolina. He attended Gaffney High School, where he played football.

On October 2, 2018, Good's younger brother, Overton, was killed in a drive-by shooting in Cherokee County, South Carolina, mobile home.

References

External links
 Indianapolis Colts bio
 NC State bio 

1991 births
Living people
People from Gaffney, South Carolina
Players of American football from South Carolina
American football offensive tackles
Indianapolis Colts players
Mars Hill Lions football players
Las Vegas Raiders players
Oakland Raiders players
Ed Block Courage Award recipients